Joe Adams (born November 22, 1989) is a former American football wide receiver. He played college football for the University of Arkansas, and was recognized as a consensus All-American.  He was drafted by the Carolina Panthers in the fourth round of the 2012 NFL Draft.

Early years
Adams was born in Little Rock, Arkansas.  Encouraged by his mother Charlotte Allmon, he finished his secondary education at Central Arkansas Christian High School in North Little Rock, Arkansas.

College career
Adams attended the University of Arkansas, where he played for the Arkansas Razorbacks football team from 2008 to 2011.  Initially, the four star receiver had verbally committed to play for the USC Trojans football, but switched to Arkansas after Bobby Petrino was hired in December 2007. Adams was a three-year starter at wide receiver, and a four-year starter as Arkansas' main punt returner. As a senior in 2011, he was recognized as a consensus first-team All-SEC player, as well as a consensus first-team All-American, after being named to the first-teams of ESPN, the Football Writers Association of America (FWAA), Pro Football Weekly, Scout.com, and Sporting News.

Adams was also the recipient of the inaugural Johnny "The Jet" Rodgers Return Specialist Award (Jet Award) in 2011, recognizing the best return specialist in all of college football. Adams returned 19 punts for 321 yards (16.9 yards per return) and 4 touchdowns (tops in the nation) in the 2011 season, helping the Razorbacks to an 11-2 record, and a victory over Kansas State in the 2012 Cotton Bowl. Adams also returned a punt 51 yards for a touchdown in the bowl game, the first punt returned for a score since former Arkansas player Lance Alworth returned one in the 1961 Cotton Bowl. But Adams' most electrifying punt return came against the Tennessee Volunteers on November 12, 2011 in Fayetteville, Arkansas. Joe caught the punt on the Razorback forty yard line, reversed his field numerous times, slipped seven tackle attempts, and wove his way through the Vols defenders for a sixty-yard return and six points. Arkansas won the game, 49-7. It is considered the most electrifying punt return in College football history.

Professional career
The Carolina Panthers selected Adams in the fourth round, 104th overall pick, of the 2012 NFL Draft.  He returned kicks in the first three games of the 2012 season before being benched after losing two fumbles in a game against the New York Giants. On August 27, he was waived.

Adams signed with the Edmonton Eskimos of the Canadian Football League in 2014, but was released before the season.
 
The Houston Texans signed Adams on August 1, 2014. The Texans released Adams on August 25, 2014.

Adams was signed to the BC Lions' practice roster on October 20, 2014. He was released by the Lions on October 31, 2014.

On April 7, 2016, Adams signed with the Texas Revolution of Allen, Texas, a founding member of Champions Indoor Football, an indoor American football league. Adams re-signed with the Revolution on January 5, 2017.

References

External links
 
 Arkansas Razorbacks bio

1989 births
Living people
Sportspeople from Little Rock, Arkansas
Players of American football from Arkansas
All-American college football players
American football return specialists
American football wide receivers
American members of the Churches of Christ
Arkansas Razorbacks football players
Carolina Panthers players
Edmonton Elks players
Houston Texans players
Texas Revolution players